Marco Haller (born 30 June 1984) is a German retired footballer who played as a midfielder.

Career 
On 30 May 2016, Haller extended his contract with Würzburger Kickers until 2017.

References

External links
 

1984 births
Living people
German footballers
Association football midfielders
2. Bundesliga players
3. Liga players
FC Augsburg players
SSV Jahn Regensburg players
VfR Aalen players
Würzburger Kickers players
1. FC Schweinfurt 05 players